Wahlstorf is a village and municipality in the district (in German Kreis) of Plön, in Schleswig-Holstein, Germany. It is part of the Amt Preetz-Land.

References

Municipalities in Schleswig-Holstein
Plön (district)